The vice-president of Sierra Leone is the  second most senior government official in the executive branch of the Republic of Sierra Leone government after the president. The vice-president's only constitutional power is to be the immediate successor to the president of Sierra Leone if the president resigned or is removed from office by the Sierra Leone parliament. Other than that the power of the vice president depends on the role delegated to the office by the president.

The vice-president of Sierra Leone is the second most influential position in the government of Sierra Leone, after the president. The current vice-president of Sierra Leone is Mohamed Juldeh Jalloh, a member of the ruling Sierra Leone People's Party; he was sworn in as vice president on April 4, 2018, after the victory of Jalloh's and Julius Maada Bio's presidential ticket in the 2018 Sierra Leone presidential election.

Security 
The vice-president of Sierra Leone is protected by a special unit of police officers of the operational support division of the Sierra Leone Police.

History
When Sierra Leone was declared a Republic in 1971 by then Prime Minister Siaka Stevens, the position of Vice-President was created. The first vice-president was Sorie Ibrahim Koroma.

Functions
The functions of the vice-president are:
Principal assistant to the president of Sierra Leone,
To act in the president's stead when he is out of Sierra Leone or incapacitated,
Control the movements of the people in the diamond-protected areas,
Permit Boards,
Various involvements with non-citizens of the Republic,
Monitor the Cabinet,
Any other duty that the president desires.

Vice-presidents

Vice-presidents

Deputy leaders of military juntas

See also
President of Sierra Leone
List of heads of state of Sierra Leone
List of heads of government of Sierra Leone
List of current vice presidents

References

External links
Vice Presidential office of the President of Sierra Leone

Sierra Leone, Vice-President of
Politics of Sierra Leone
Government of Sierra Leone
Sierra Leone
1971 establishments in Sierra Leone
 
Lists of Sierra Leonean people
Sierra Leone politics-related lists